Napias Creek is a stream in the U.S. state of Idaho.
 
Napias Creek derives its name from a Native American word meaning "money".

References

Rivers of Lemhi County, Idaho
Rivers of Idaho